John Atte Wode was elected MP for Worcester in November 1372, November 1373, April 1376, January 1380 and November 1380.

The family held land at Trimpley, Wolverley and Wood Acton, all in Worcestershire.

References

English MPs 1372
English MPs 1373
English MPs 1376
English MPs January 1380
Members of the Parliament of England for Worcester
English MPs November 1380